Kulemesovo is a rural locality (a village) in Kubenskoye Rural Settlement, Vologodsky District, Vologda Oblast, Russia. The population was 13 as of 2002.

Geography 
Kulemesovo is located 23 km northwest of Vologda (the district's administrative centre) by road. Baralovo is the nearest rural locality.

References 

Rural localities in Vologodsky District